Autoroute 55 may refer to:
 A55 autoroute, in France 
 Quebec Autoroute 55, in Quebec, Canada

See also 
 A55 roads
 List of highways numbered 55